Skiti is a community located in the far west of the city of Kozani in northern Greece. It has a population of 289 (2011).

References

Kozani
Populated places in Kozani (regional unit)